Trébol Clan was a reggaeton group from Puerto Rico, introduced in the genre by DJ Joe. Trébol Clan is well known in the genre of reggaeton. Formed by Periquito, Omar & Berto, Trébol Clan has been featured in Don Omar's The Last Don and Los Bandoleros, Luny Tunes's Mas Flow 2 and have released one CD in the genre named Los Bacatranes. When they had their own label, they released the mixtape Los Reyes De La Lenta: The ComeBack (2008).

History
The group first appeared in the late 1990s with DJ Joe. DJ Joe and Trébol Clan is the name that was given to this group halfway through 1997. Before that, Trébol Clan was composed of four people: DJ Joe, Berto, Hector and Omar. And their first musical appearances were on CDs titled “DJ Joe Vol. 3", "Rican Muffin", "DJ Joe Vol. 4, 5 and 6". Then, because of the chemistry that they had with DJ Joe, the latter decided in 2000 to be the musical producer of his first record company production titled, “DJ Joe y Trébol Clan – Los Genios Musicales”. Later, after the success of the CD, Omar entered the religious field and abandoned the group leaving only Hector, Berto and DJ Joe. For Trébol Clan, the success made them reach the production of “Fatal Fantassy” surpassing the 50,000 sold mark.

Then the musical career of Trébol Clan continued after a series of takeovers by various artists record companies like “Gárgolas (Vol. 2, 3, 4), “Fatal Fantassy (Vol. 1, 2, 3)”, “The Godfather”, "Buddha's Family", “Boricuas NY Vol. 2”, “Playero 42 ”, “Luny Tunes Mas Flow” (more than 150,000 copies sold) and Don Omar's "The Last Don" (more than 325,000 copies sold). With melodies like “Tu Cuerpo Me Arrebata” from Don Omar's The Last Don, “Bailando Provocas” from the CD Luny Tunes' Mas Flow, “Tu Cuerpo Baila Conmigo” from the CD Ranking Stone Censurado and "Agárrala" y "A Ti" from Gárgolas 4, Trébol Clan was shown to be one of the hottest groups on the Island. Because of this, they were asked to perform in various productions, like when they participated in Don Omar's concert, where the Roberto Clemente Coliseum was filled to capacity, and the performance of the song with Don Omar and the song from the CD LunyTunes y Noreiga Mas Flow, being the most acclaimed of the great event.

The work continued in 2008 when Trébol Clan launched its CD on the market titled Los Reyes De La Lenta: The ComeBack. This new CD featured artists Jowell & Randy, Franco "El Gorila", J-King & Maximan and Tito "El Bambino". A new single, "Wow", was produced by their new label "Blow Music Factory". The Comeback was re-launched as a digital release in 2009 by independent label, Brutal Noise, worldwide on January 15, 2009. Fantasia Musical hit the streets on June 23, 2009.

As of March 4, 2010 Trébol Clan have separated and Periquito came to be known as '3Bol'. Both went separate ways. Perry is now known as 3BOL, but recently announced he is Trébol Clan now on his own Berto has gone solo signing under Millones records. Recently, Trébol Clan mostly collaborates with many different underground reggaeton artist from different Spanish speaking countries including, Peru, Guatemala, and Puerto Rico. In 2019, Trébol Clan said they were working on new material called Forever Young.

Discography

Studio albums
 2004: Los Bacatranes
2010: Trébol Clan Es Trébol Clan
 2015: Yo Soy Trébol: El Artista

Collaborative albums 

 2000: Los Genios Musicales (con DJ Joe)
 2009: The Producers (con Dr. Joe y Mr. Frank)

Mixtapes

 2008: The Comeback
 2009: Fantasía Musical

References

Reggaeton groups